Chen Hong is the name of:

 Chen Hong (painter) ( 8th century), Tang dynasty imperial court painter
 Chen Hong (actress) (born 1968), Chinese actress
 Chen Hong (softball) (born 1970), Chinese softball player
 Chen Hong (badminton) (born 1979), Chinese badminton player
 Chen Hong (figure skater) (born 1994), Chinese ice dancer
 Chen Jian Hong (born 1975), Taiwanese racing driver

See also
 Hong Chen (born 1991), Chinese pop singer